Proparachaeta is a genus of parasitic flies in the family Tachinidae. There are about six described species in Proparachaeta.

Species
These six species belong to the genus Proparachaeta:
 Proparachaeta capixaba Toma & Guimaraes, 2000
 Proparachaeta carvalhoi Toma & Guimaraes, 2000
 Proparachaeta danunciae Toma & Guimaraes, 2000
 Proparachaeta paraguayensis Townsend, 1928
 Proparachaeta quinquevittata Blanchard, 1942
 Proparachaeta rosae Toma & Guimaraes, 2000

References

Further reading

 
 
 
 

Tachinidae
Articles created by Qbugbot